Van Allen Clinton McCoy (January 6, 1940 – July 6, 1979) was an American musician, record producer, arranger, songwriter, singer and orchestra conductor. He is known for his 1975 internationally successful song "The Hustle". He has approximately 700 song copyrights to his credit, and produced songs by such recording artists as Gladys Knight & the Pips, The Stylistics, Aretha Franklin, Brenda & the Tabulations, David Ruffin, Peaches & Herb, Lesley Gore and Stacy Lattisaw.

Background and early years

Early life
Van McCoy was born in Washington, D.C., the second child of Norman S. McCoy, Sr. and Lillian Ray. He learned to play piano at a young age and sang with the Metropolitan Baptist Church choir as a youngster.

By the age of 12, he had begun writing his own songs, in addition to performing in local amateur shows alongside his older brother, Norman Jr. The two brothers formed a doo-wop combo named the Starlighters with two friends while in Theodore Roosevelt High School. In 1956, they recorded a single entitled, "The Birdland", a novelty dance record. It gained some interest, resulting in a tour with saxophonist Vi Burnside. In 1959, the Starlighters produced three singles for End Records that included "I Cried". Marriage and other commitments eventually caused the group to disband during the mid-1950s. Van also sang with a group called the Marylanders.

During 1961, McCoy met and became romantically involved with Kendra Spotswood (also known as Sandi Sheldon) who lived near his family. For the next five years, they sang and recorded music together professionally. Their relationship ended when McCoy delayed their wedding plans because of a work contract he had signed with Columbia Records.

Career (late 1950s to 1970s)
In September 1958, McCoy entered Howard University to study psychology but dropped out after two years in order to relocate to Philadelphia, where he formed his own recording company, Rockin' Records, releasing his first single, "Hey Mr. DJ", in 1959. This single gained the attention of Scepter Records owner Florence Greenberg, who hired McCoy as a staff writer and A&R representative for the label. As a writer there, McCoy composed his first success, "Stop the Music", for the popular female vocal group, The Shirelles, in 1962. He was co-owner of Vando Records with Philly D.J. Jocko Henderson. He owned the Share record label and co-owned the Maxx record label in the mid-1960s, supervising such artists as Gladys Knight & the Pips, Chris Bartley and The Ad Libs.

He came into his own after first working for top producers Jerry Leiber and Mike Stoller as a writer, and then signing with the major April-Blackwood music publishing concern, connected with Columbia Records. McCoy went on to write a string of hits as the 1960s progressed. He penned "Giving Up" for Gladys Knight & the Pips (later a hit for both The Ad Libs and Donny Hathaway), "The Sweetest Thing This Side of Heaven" for Chris Bartley, "When You're Young and in Love" for Ruby & the Romantics (later a hit for The Marvelettes), "Right on the Tip of My Tongue" for Brenda & the Tabulations, "Baby I'm Yours" for Barbara Lewis, "Getting Mighty Crowded" for Betty Everett, "Abracadabra" for Erma Franklin, "You're Gonna Make Me Love You" for Sandi Sheldon, and "I Get the Sweetest Feeling" for Jackie Wilson. He also put together the hit-making duo of Peaches & Herb, arranging and co-producing their first hit, "Let's Fall in Love", for the Columbia subsidiary Date in 1966. In the same year McCoy recorded a solo LP for Columbia entitled Night Time Is Lonely Time, and a year later started his own short-lived label, Vando, as well as his own production company VMP (Van McCoy Productions).

Van wrote or produced most consistently for The Presidents ("5-10-15-20 (25-30 Years of Love)"), The Choice Four, recording as The Finger Pointers ("Come Down to Earth"), Faith, Hope & Charity ("To Each His Own" and "Life Goes On") and David Ruffin ("Walk Away from Love"). In the early 1970s, McCoy began a long, acclaimed collaboration with songwriter/producer, Charles Kipps, and arranged several hits for the soul group The Stylistics as well as releasing his own solo LP on the Buddah label, Soul Improvisations, in 1972. The album included a minor hit, "Let Me Down Easy", but it was not a success following poor promotion. Following his success with The Hustle, it was re-released in abridged form (two songs less) as From Disco to Love. He formed his own orchestra, Soul City Symphony and, with singers Faith, Hope and Charity, produced several albums and gave many performances.

Television and film
Van McCoy appeared on the Mike Douglas Show and was a regular guest on The Tonight Show. He wrote and sang the theme song for the 1978 movie Sextette that starred Mae West and Timothy Dalton and made a cameo appearance in it, playing a delegate from Africa. He also contributed some music for A Woman Called Moses. Along with Faith Hope & Charity, Brass Construction and Johnny Dark, he appeared in episode 4.20 of Don Kirshner's Rock Concert.

Mainstream success
In 1975, McCoy released to low expectations the mostly instrumental LP Disco Baby for the Avco (later H&L) label. The title song, "Disco Baby", was written by George David Weiss, Hugo Peretti and Luigi Creatore, and was also performed by The Stylistics for their 1975 album Thank You Baby. Unexpectedly, a single called "The Hustle" from the album, written about the dance of the same name and recorded last for the album, went to the top of both the Billboard pop and R&B charts (also No. 3 in the UK) and won a Grammy Award. The album was also nominated for a Grammy. McCoy, then regarded as a disco hitmaker, never repeated the success of the song, although the singles "Party", "That's the Joint" and "Change with the Times" got significant airplay. The latter reached No. 6 in the Billboard R&B chart and was a top 40 hit in the UK. 

On June 19th, 1975, McCoy was in Montreal, Canada, attending a reception hosted by Quality Records at the Limelight night club. There he was presented with a giant award with the inscription, "Presented to Van McCoy by Quality Records Limited, in recognition of "Love Is the Answer" for the song's achieving hit status in Quebec. The function was to also commemorate the first concert appearance of Van McCoy and the Soul City Symphony at the  Montreal Forum the next day on the 20th.

There were no further major sellers in the US, despite a series of follow-up albums, From Disco to Love (the abridged 1975 reissue of Soul Improvisations), The Disco Kid (1975), The Real McCoy (1976), Rhythms of the World (1976), My Favorite Fantasy (1978), Lonely Dancer (1979) and Sweet Rhythm (1979). However, he scored the UK top 5 again during 1977 with the instrumental success "The Shuffle". which became the theme tune for BBC Radio 4's Sport on Four.

McCoy also had success with David Ruffin's comeback album, Who I Am, featuring "Walk Away from Love", (US number 9, US number 1 R&B) in the US and a UK top 10 success. He went on to produce the next two albums for Ruffin, which spawned further successes. McCoy produced Gladys Knight & the Pips' Still Together LP, and for Melba Moore ("This Is It" and "Lean on Me"). He discovered Faith, Hope And Charity, whose major success in 1975, "To Each His Own", was another R&B chart-topper. In 1975, he also arranged two of his compositions "My Heart's Too Big for My Head" and "You've Got to Tell Her" for the Asha Puthli album She Loves to Hear the Music.

1978 to 1979

1978
"My Favorite Fantasy"
On March 25, 1978, his new album, My Favorite Fantasy was reviewed. It was made up of original McCoy compositions and was co-produced with Charles Kipps. The clarity, smoothness and easiness of his vocals as well as the strength and instrumental rhythm was noted. The picks by Billboard were, "That's the Story of My Life", "Two Points", "You're So Right for Me", "Before and After", and "Wings of Love". Two weeks later on April 8, his single  "My Favorite Fantasy" was a recommended soul single in the Billboard Top Single Picks section. Susan Kluth's review in Record Mirror even though McCoy's faultless vocals, the aspects of human life, heart - wrenching lyrics etc. were noted, she didn't indicate much keenness on her part.  

"My Favorite Fantasy" would become a hit. While it was charting, another composition of his, "Don't Pity Me" by Faith Hope & Charity was seeing chart action in the same Billboard and Cash Box charts. "My Favorite Fantasy" peaked at #76 on the Billboard Hot Soul Singles chart, peaked at #51 on the Cash Box Top 100 R&B chart, It peaked at #48 on the Record World R&B singles chart, and in Canada, it peaked at #37 on the RPM Adult Oriented Playlist chart. It also got on to the Record Mirror UK Disco Top 90  chart, peaking at #70. 

Further activities
In late 1978, a single, "I'm Not Dreaming" credited to Zulema (and friend) backed with "Gotta Find a Way" was released on LeJoint 5N-34002.

1979
In early January, Richie Rivera presented for the first time his mix of Van McCoy's "Lonely Dancer" at a New York City club. On the week of January 20, 1979, Cash Box wrote that a 12" release of "Lonely Dancer" / "Samba" was being released on MCA that week.

"I'm Not Dreaming" was in the Soul section of Billboard's Top Single Picks for the week of January 20, 1979. The review was favorable. The friend singing with Zulema was actually Van McCoy. The reviewer put it on par with other "silky, romantic" recent hit recordings by Johnny Mathis & Deniece Williams, and Roberta Flack & Donny Hathaway. 

By February, the Lonely Dancer album was out. It was reviewed by Cash Box in the February 24 issue. Referring to McCoy's and Charles Kipps' production values as stellar and first rate background harmonies, the reviewer said that McCoy's baritone vocals were mostly first rate. The picks were "Merry Go Round", "The Samba" and "Lonely Dancer". His release was part of an extensive campaign by MCA for the February releases which included releases by Joe Ely, Lane Caudell, Jeffree and Mel Tillis. The promotion for McCoy's album was to build a strong 
base at a disco and R&B level. The paraphernalia to be distributed to the press, radio and retailers included a four-color poster and four-color button.

"I'm Not Dreaming" entered the Billboard Hot Soul Singles chart, peaking at #76 (week seven) on March 17, 1979, holding the position for another week. It had a total run of nine weeks in the chart.

Death
In the morning of July 6, 1979, McCoy suffered a heart attack and died at his home on Englewood, New Jersey, at the age of 39. He is buried in the McCoy family plot at Lincoln Memorial Cemetery, Suitland, Maryland, a suburb of Washington, D.C.

Discography

Studio albums

 Albums credited to Van McCoy & the Soul City Symphony

Compilation albums

Singles

 Singles credited to Jack & Jill
 Singles credited to the Van McCoy Strings
 Singles credited to Van McCoy & the Soul City Symphony
 "Soul Cha Cha" charted with the tracks "Rhythms of the World" and "That's the Joint" on the Disco Action chart

References

External links

Van McCoy at Soul Walking

Audio
 Betopubs channel - VAN McCOY - the hustle (1975) (HQ)
 Joel Diamond channel - Every Year When Summer Turns To Fall by Van McCoy
 Metropolitan Soul channel - My Favourite Fantasy ~ Van McCoy
 Purerawsoul channel - Van Mccoy - Merry go round.wmv

 
1940 births
1979 deaths
20th-century American male singers
20th-century American businesspeople
20th-century American conductors (music)
20th-century African-American male singers
African-American songwriters
American male conductors (music)
American disco singers
American male singer-songwriters
American rhythm and blues singer-songwriters
Record producers from Washington, D.C.
Singer-songwriters from Washington, D.C.
Howard University alumni
Avco Records artists
Liberty Records artists
Grammy Award winners